Shen Shixing (1535-1614) was a Chinese politician of the Ming dynasty born in Changzhou County, South Zhili (present-day Suzhou). Due to Zhang Juzheng's help, he was appointed the Minister of Rites and afterwards Minister of Personnel and Grand Secretary of the Jianji Hall during the reign of Wanli. He later acted as the Senior Grand Secretary, the de facto Grand Chancellor of Ming, tried to mediate between the emperor and other ministers and took part in the drafting of Collected Statutes of the Ming Dynasty.

See also
 1587, a Year of No Significance

References

Senior Grand Secretaries of the Ming dynasty
People from Suzhou
Ming dynasty calligraphers